Josefův Důl refers to the following places in the Czech Republic:

 Josefův Důl (Jablonec nad Nisou District)
 Josefův Důl (Mladá Boleslav District)